Zoki may be:

Zoki River in the northern Democratic Republic of the Congo
A hypocorism of the Slavic given name Zoran
, a Japanese Heian-era monk who wrote The Master of the Hut; see Travelers of a Hundred Ages